Diphthamide biosynthesis protein 1 is a protein that in humans is encoded by the DPH1 gene. It encodes a protein that performs posttranslational modification of histidine-715 on eukaryotic translation elongation factor 2 to diphthamide. This modification appears to be important in the translation of Cyclin D in ovarian cells. DPH1 is mutated in 90% of ovarian cancers end stage, usually by loss of heterozygosity.

References

Further reading

Post-translational modification